Passers By is a 1916 American silent drama film directed by Stanner E.V. Taylor and starring Mary Charleson,  Charles Cherry and Kate Sergeantson. It is based on a 1911 West End play of the same title by C. Haddon Chambers, which was later remade as Passers By in 1920.

Synopsis
In England a young man falls in love with the governess to his stepsister's children. When she discovers about the potential relationship she does her best to sabotage it due to her snobbish attitudes.

Cast
 Mary Charleson as 	Margaret Summers
 Charles Cherry as 	Peter Waverton
 Donald Kite as 	Peter Summers
 Kate Sergeantson as Lady Hurley 
 Marguerite Skirvin as 	Beatrice Dainton

References

Bibliography
 Connelly, Robert B. The Silents: Silent Feature Films, 1910-36, Volume 40, Issue 2. December Press, 1998.
 Goble, Alan. The Complete Index to Literary Sources in Film. Walter de Gruyter, 1999.

External links
 

1910s American films
1916 films
1916 drama films
1910s English-language films
American silent feature films
Silent American drama films
American black-and-white films
Films directed by Stanner E.V. Taylor
World Film Company films
American films based on plays
Films set in London